The 2017 Navy Midshipmen football team represented the United States Naval Academy in the 2017 NCAA Division I FBS football season. The Midshipmen were led by tenth-year head coach Ken Niumatalolo and played their home games at Navy–Marine Corps Memorial Stadium. The Midshipmen competed as a member of the West Division of the American Athletic Conference and were third-year members of the conference. They finished the season 7–6 overall and 4–4 in AAC play to tie for third place in the West Division. They were invited to the Military Bowl, where they defeated Virginia, 49–7.

Before the season

Previous season
The Navy Midshipmen began the 2016 season with three straight wins, but lost to military rival Air Force. However, the Midshipmen had victories over fellow American Conference teams #6 ranked Houston and Memphis. After beating long-time rival Notre Dame, winning the Rip Miller Trophy, the Midshipmen went on a three-game winning streak. However, Navy ended their season with a loss over military rival Army in the 117th Army–Navy Game, ending Navy's 14th consecutive victories over Army. The Midshipmen finished the regular season with a 9–4 record. Despite this slide, it earned them an invitation to the Armed Force Bowl, their 13th bowl game in a row, but they lost to the 8–5 Louisiana Tech Bulldogs 45–48.

Spring practices
Navy held spring practices during March and April 2017.

During the season

On television
The 2017 Navy Midshipmen football team is featured in the miniseries, A Season With Navy Football on Showtime, which premiered on Tuesday September 5, 2017. It depicts daily life of Midshipmen football players and coaches at the United States Naval Academy in Annapolis, Maryland. Each episode reviews highlights of every football game played during the current season of Navy football, as the series narrator boasts, is "one of the most accomplished football programs in the country".

Schedule

Personnel

Coaching staff

Roster

Depth chart

Depth Chart 2017
True Freshman
Double Position : *

Rankings

Game summaries

at Florida Atlantic

After a lightning delay, Navy ended the long night with a total of 345 yards. Also, Midshipmen quarterback Zack Abey, making his third start, rushed for 200 yards and passed for 100. This achievement made it the first time in Naval Academy history that a quarter has done so in a single game.

Tulane

With this victory, Navy has won their 15th straight regular season win playing at their home stadium. In addition to head coach Ken Niumatalolo's 79th career win at Navy, the most in Naval Academy history.

Cincinnati

With this victory, Navy Midshipmen set a Naval Academy record for 16 consecutive wins at home, making it the longest active regular season streak in the FBS. They also set a new record in Navy football history for the most rushing yards in a single game with 573. (This beat their previous record set on November 10, 2007, at North Texas with 572 yards.)

at Tulsa

Air Force

With a stadium-record crowd, this victory earned the Midshipmen their best start since they went 5–0 in 2004. Game highlights include, Midshipmen slotback Malcolm Perry had two touchdowns; a 40-yard catch and a 91-yard touchdown run, the second longest TD run in Navy history. While quarterback Zach Abey ran for 214 yards and two touchdowns, rushing for 75 yards on one. Also the Midshipmen rushed for 400-plus yards in three straight games. The last team to do so was Rice with four straight games (1996).

at Memphis

UCF

at Temple

SMU

Navy slotback/quarterback Malcolm Perry had a breakout performance in for the injured but active quarterback Zach Abey. Perry rushed for 282 yards with 4 touchdowns in his first start at quarterback (third most in Naval Academy history). Also, fullback Anthony Gargiulo ran for a career-high 145 yards with a touchdown. Backup kicker J.R. Osborn kicked an 18-yard, game-winning field goal as time expired to give the Midshipmen the win in dramatic fashion. With this victory, Navy becomes bowl eligible for the 15th time in the last 16 seasons. It's also Navy's 35th win on Senior Day in the last four years, a milestone few schools have reached.

at Notre Dame

at Houston

vs. Army

vs. Virginia (Military Bowl)

With their fourth bowl game victory in five seasons, Navy ran the ball 76 times for 452 rushing yards and scored seven rushing touchdowns. All TD's came from quarterbacks Malcolm Perry and Zach Abey. Getting his third start at QB, Perry rushed for two touchdowns and led the Midshipmen with 114 rushing yards. Abey came into the game after Perry suffered a foot injury in the third quarter and scored five rushing touchdowns with 88 total yards. Abey became the 5th player in FBS and Military Bowl history to rush for five touchdowns in a FBS bowl game, joining Barry Sanders and Kareem Hunt.

References

Navy
Navy Midshipmen football seasons
Military Bowl champion seasons
Navy Midshipmen football